Cage the Elephant is the debut studio album by American rock band Cage the Elephant. The album was produced by Jay Joyce and released on 23 June 2008, in Europe by Relentless Records, and on 24 March 2009, in the United States by RCA/Jive Label Group. It was certified platinum by the RIAA and spawned four singles.

Chart performance
Cage the Elephant debuted on the UK Albums Chart at number 38 in its week of release, and debuted at number 171 on the Billboard 200, later rising to number 67. On the release of the band's second album, Thank You, Happy Birthday, Cage the Elephant reappeared on the Billboard 200, this time reaching number 59.

Singles
The first and second singles from the album, "Free Love" and "In One Ear", did not make significant impact on any charts. However, the third single "Ain't No Rest for the Wicked" (from its original 2008 release) reached number 32 on the UK Singles Chart, and a later 2009 US release reached number 3 on the Alternative Songs chart, number 8 on the Mainstream Rock Tracks chart, and number 83 on the Billboard Hot 100 pop chart. Although it was their most successful and most popular single to date, it did not reach number one on the Alternative Songs chart like "In One Ear" and "Back Against the Wall", but it actually had more airplay on alternative rock radio stations than the other two and it was also the most played Cage the Elephant song on the radio. It was also used in numerous television spots, becoming their most popular single so far. "Back Against the Wall" was the fourth single from the album and reached number one on the Billboard Alternative Songs chart, number 26 on the Mainstream Rock Tracks chart, and number 12 on the Rock Songs chart. The song "Ain't No Rest for the Wicked" was used in the opening cutscene to the video game Borderlands.

Track listing

Personnel

Cage the Elephant
 Matt Shultz – lead vocals
 Brad Shultz – rhythm guitar
 Jared Champion – drums
 Daniel Tichenor – bass guitar, backing vocals
 Lincoln Parish – lead guitar

Technical personnel
 Jay Joyce – producer
 Jason Hall – engineer 
 Howie Weinberg – mastering

Charts

Weekly charts

Year-end charts

Certifications and sales

Release history

References

2008 debut albums
Cage the Elephant albums
Albums produced by Jay Joyce
RCA Records albums